La gare inondée (The Flooded Station) is an oil on canvas painting by the Portuguese-French artist Maria Helena Vieira da Silva that she executed in 1956. It was to be auctioned at Christie's, London, on 13 February 2014, when it was expected to fetch between £350,000 and £450,000, but was withdrawn.

Description

The painting is typical of da Silva's 1950s work that define her oeuvre and which paralleled the development of abstract expressionism in America at the same time. However da Silva's work differs from that movement in her treatment of space. She sought to free herself from the constraint of linear perspective, achieving in her mature work a sense of space with a dense mesh of lines and marks set against a background of flecks of color  varying in intensity of tone.

Provenance
 The Artist.
 Mrs. Arpad Szenes, Paris.
 Fundação Calouste Gulbenkian, Lisbon.
 Galerie Jeanne Bucher, Paris.
 Denise Cadé Gallery, New York.
 Acquired from the above by the present owner in circa 1985.

References

Citations

Bibliography
 G. Weelen and J.-F. Jaeger, Vieira da Silva Catalogue Raisonné, Geneva 1994, no. 1407 (illustrated, p. 279).

1956 paintings
Paintings by Maria Helena Vieira da Silva
Railway stations